Santa Rosa District may refer to the following places:

Peru
 Santa Rosa District, Chiclayo, in Chiclayo province, Lambayeque region
 Santa Rosa District, El Collao, in El Collao province, Puno region
 Santa Rosa District, El Dorado, in El Dorado province, San Martín region
 Santa Rosa District, Grau, in Grau province, Apurímac region
 Santa Rosa District, Jaén, in Jaén province, Cajamarca region
 Santa Rosa District, La Mar, in La Mar province, Ayacucho region
 Santa Rosa District, Lima, in Lima province 
 Santa Rosa District, Melgar, in Melgar province, Puno region
 Santa Rosa District, Pallasca, in Pallasca province, Ancash region
 Santa Rosa District, Rodríguez de Mendoza, in Rodríguez de Mendoza province, Amazonas region
 Santa Rosa de Ocopa District, in Concepción province, Junín region
 Santa Rosa de Quives District, in Canta province, Lima region
 Santa Rosa de Sacco District, in Yauli province, Junín region

Costa Rica
 Santa Rosa District, Oreamuno, Cartago province
 Santa Rosa District, Santo Domingo, Heredia province
 Santa Rosa District, Tilarán, Guanacaste province
 Santa Rosa District, Turrialba, Cartago province